Stephen Crowe is an English composer of chamber operas and experimental music. His work has been performed internationally. After performances in London, Edinburgh, Dublin, Cambridge and Berlin his The Francis Bacon Opera was described as both "pretentious nonsense" and "avoiding the pitfalls of pretentiousness".

References

External links
 

Living people
English composers
English conductors (music)
British male conductors (music)
21st-century British conductors (music)
21st-century British male musicians
Year of birth missing (living people)